Orbamia is a genus of moths in the family Geometridae described by Claude Herbulot in 1966.

Species 
Orbamia contains the following species:

 Orbamia abiyi Hausmann & Tujuba, 2020
 Orbamia balensis Hausmann & Tujuba, 2020
 Orbamia becki Hausmann, 2006
 Orbamia clarior Hausmann & Tujuba, 2020
 Orbamia clarissima Hausmann & Tujuba, 2020
 Orbamia emanai Hausmann & Tujuba, 2020
 Orbamia marginata Hausmann & Tujuba, 2020
 Orbamia obliqua Hausmann & Tujuba, 2020
 Orbamia ocellata (Warren, 1897)
 Orbamia octomaculata (Wallengren, 1872)
 Orbamia pauperata Herbulot, 1966
 Orbamia renimacula (Prout, 1926)

References

Geometridae